The 1st Academy Awards ceremony, presented by the Academy of Motion Picture Arts and Sciences (AMPAS) and hosted by AMPAS president Douglas Fairbanks, honored the best films from 1 August 1927 to 31 July 1928 and took place on May 16, 1929, at a private dinner held at the Hollywood Roosevelt Hotel in Los Angeles, California. It is the only Academy Awards ceremony not broadcast on either radio or television; a radio broadcast was introduced for the 2nd Academy Awards.

During the ceremony, AMPAS presented Academy Awards  later to be colloquially known as "Oscars"  in 12 categories. The winners had been announced three months ahead of the ceremony. Some nominations did not reference a specific film, such as Ralph Hammeras and Nugent Slaughter, who were nominated for Engineering Effects, a category that was dropped the following year (along with those for Unique and Artistic Production, Best Director (Comedy), and Best Title Writing). Unlike later ceremonies, an actor could be awarded for multiple films: Emil Jannings won Best Actor for his work in both The Way of All Flesh and The Last Command, while Best Actress winner Janet Gaynor was honored for three films. Charlie Chaplin and Warner Brothers each received an Honorary Award.

Major winners at the ceremony included 7th Heaven and Sunrise, with three awards apiece (the latter winning for Unique and Artistic Picture), and Wings receiving two awards, including Outstanding Picture. The following year, the Academy dropped Unique and Artistic Picture and decided retroactively that the award won by Wings was its highest honor.

Background 

In 1927, the Academy of Motion Picture Arts and Sciences (AMPAS) was established by Louis B. Mayer, the founder of the Louis B. Mayer Pictures Corporation, which then would be joined into Metro-Goldwyn-Mayer (MGM). Mayer's purpose in creating the award was to unite the five branches of the film industry: actors, directors, producers, technicians, and writers. Mayer commented on the creation of the awards "I found that the best way to handle [filmmakers] was to hang medals all over them ... If I got them cups and awards, they'd kill them to produce what I wanted. That's why the Academy Award was created". Mayer asked Cedric Gibbons, art director of MGM, to design an Academy Award trophy. Nominees were notified through a telegram in February 1928. In August 1928, Mayer contacted the Academy Central Board of Judges to decide winners. However, according to the American director King Vidor, the voting for the Academy Award for Best Picture was in the hands of the AMPAS founders: Mayer, Douglas Fairbanks, Sid Grauman, Mary Pickford, and Joseph Schenck.

Ceremony 

The ceremony was held on May 16, 1929, at the Hollywood Roosevelt Hotel, located in Los Angeles. It consisted of a private dinner with 36 banquet tables, where 270 people attended and tickets cost $5. Actors and actresses arrived at the hotel in luxury vehicles, where many fans attended to encourage celebrities. The ceremony was not broadcast on radio or television, and was hosted by AMPAS director Fairbanks during a  event.

Overview 

Winners were announced three months before the ceremony. The recipients included: Emil Jannings, the inaugural first award recipient for Best Actor (The Way of All Flesh and The Last Command); Janet Gaynor for Best Actress (7th Heaven, Street Angel, and Sunrise: A Song of Two Humans); Frank Borzage for Best Director, Drama (7th Heaven); Lewis Milestone for Best Director, Comedy (Two Arabian Knights); and Wings for Best Picture (the most expensive film of its time). Two presentations were made of a Special Award: to Charles Chaplain and Warner Bros.

Honorary awards

Charlie Chaplin, a multiple nominee for one movie (Best Actor, Best Writer and Best Director, Comedy; all for The Circus) (1928) having been removed from the list so as to recognize his total contribution to the industry; and Warner Bros., an award for pioneering talking pictures (The Jazz Singer). Three categories were eliminated for subsequent presentations: Best Engineering Effects, Best Title Writing, and Best Unique and Artistic Quality of Production. The larger film producers received the preponderance of awards: Fox Film Corporation, Metro-Goldwyn-Mayer, Paramount Pictures, Radio-Keith-Orpheum, and Warner Bros.

Winners and nominees 

At the 1st Academy Awards (19271928), the nomination process allowed candidates to be nominated  and to be awarded  for either, a single film, multiple films, or without reference to any specific film.

Nominees were announced on February 2, 1929. Winners are listed first, in boldface, and indicated with an asterisk.

 Notes

Honorary Awards 

The following Honorary Awards  then called Special Awards  were conferred:

 Charles Chaplin  "To Charles Chaplin, for acting, writing, directing and producing The Circus".
 Warner Bros.  "To Warner Bros., for producing The Jazz Singer, the pioneer outstanding talking picture, which has revolutionized the industry".

Multiple nominations and awards 

The following six films received multiple nominations:

The following three films received multiple awards:

Changes to Academy Awards 
After the 1st Academy Awards (19271928), the following changes were made by the AMPAS.

 Award categories were reduced from twelve to seven:
 The awards for Best Directing (Comedy Picture) and Best Directing (Dramatic Picture) were merged into a single Best Directing award.
 The award for Best Engineering Effects was discontinued.
 The award for Best Unique and Artistic Picture was discontinued.
 The awards for Best Writing (Adaptation) and Best Writing (Original Story) were merged into a single Best Writing award.
 The award for Best Writing (Title Writing) was discontinued.

Gallery

See also 

 1927 in film
 1928 in film

References

Bibliography 

 
 

1928 film awards
1929 in Los Angeles
1929 in American cinema
Academy Awards ceremonies
May 1929 events